The Answers is the first album by Blue October. It was recorded in October 1997, at Sound Arts Studio in Houston, Texas. It was released in the United States, during January 1998, by RoDan Entertainment/Scoop. It is Blue October's only album featuring founding member and bass guitarist Liz Mullally, who also played piano on the album.

For several years the band was not allowed to sell the album on its website or at concerts because of its contract with Universal Records. The album was only available by mail order directly from RoDan (Justin and Jeremy Furstenfeld's parents Roann and Dan Furstenfeld, who managed the band at the beginning) until an agreement was reached in 2005.

The album was re-released in the US by Universal Records in 2008. However, the re-released version was packaged in a digipak and did not include the booklet that accompanied the original version of the album. The Answers was also originally released on cassette tape in addition to CD. Cassette versions of the album are extremely rare, and have become collectors items among Blue October fans.

Between January and April 2018, the album became unavailable on various streaming services, such as Apple Music and Spotify. The reason for this change is unknown, but the rest of the band's catalogue remains on the platforms.

Many of the songs on the album deal with themes of depression, including "Black Orchid", which is about suicide.

Track listing
All songs were written by Justin Furstenfeld.

Personnel
Brian Baker - producer, engineer, mastering, mixing
Adrian Garcia - assistant engineer
Jeff Wells - mastering
Ryan Delahoussaye - mandolin, violin
Jeremy Furstenfeld - percussion, drums
Justin Furstenfeld - lyricist, guitars, vocalist, piano, drums
Liz Mullaly - bass guitar, piano

References

1998 debut albums
Blue October albums